Tulir - Centre for the Prevention and Healing of Child Sexual Abuse (CPHCSA) is an NGO working on child sexual abuse awareness and rehabilitation, based in Chennai, India. In Tamil, the word Tulir means the first tender leaves of a plant symbolising children and "the belief in the resilience and resurgence of the human spirit." The NGO is run by Vidya Reddy.

Background 
According to a 2007 study conducted by the Ministry of Women and Child Development, one out of every two children (53.22%) is sexually abused, however, in a conservative society where sex itself is a taboo, sexual abuse of children goes unnoticed and underreported. Tulir along with Save The Children conducted a study in 2005 which surveyed 2211 school children in Chennai from across backgrounds. The study found out that 48 percent of boys and 39 percent of girls they interviewed had been sexually abused and the accused were known to them.

Activities 
Tulir raises awareness on child sexual abuse in India, provides direct intervention services in the areas of prevention and healing, undertakes research, documentation and dissemination of information on child sexual abuse and works towards improving policy and advancing practice to prevent and address cases of child sexual abuse with a special focus on psychosocial well being of the children. It also participated in local, national and international efforts to promote and protect the rights of children.

Tulir holds workshops for schools to address child sexual abuse holistically. One such workshop was held from November 28–30, 2016 called "Safe Schools: Supporting schools address child sexual abuse, holistically" and covered topics such as prevention of child sexual abuse; evolving a child protection policy; an introduction to personal safety education—concepts and practice; addressing sexual misbehaviors in children and youth and POCSO, educators and schools.

They also offer trainings and consultancy services to teachers, social workers, doctors, parents, lawyers and police personnel.

Awards and honours 
In 2006, Tulir was honored with an international award by the Women's World Summit Foundation on the occasion of the World Day for Prevention of Child Abuse (19 November) in Geneva.

References

External links 

Child-related organisations in India
Child sexual abuse in India
Year of establishment missing